Events during the year 1929 in  Northern Ireland.

Incumbents
 Governor - 	 The Duke of Abercorn 
 Prime Minister - James Craig

Events
8 February – A Belfast court sentences Fianna Fáil leader Éamon de Valera to one month in jail for illegally entering County Armagh.
22 May – Northern Ireland general election for the Parliament of Northern Ireland, the first held following abolition of proportional representation and the redrawing of electoral boundaries to create single-seat territorial constituencies. The Ulster Unionist Party retains a substantial majority.
30 May – United Kingdom general election.
23 July – Construction of the first 1000 ft (300 m)-long ocean liner, RMMV Oceanic, for the White Star Line, begun by Harland and Wolff in Belfast in 1928, is cancelled.
Six banks in Northern Ireland begin to issue banknotes in sterling.

Sport

Football
International
2 February Wales 2 - 2 Northern Ireland (in Wrexham)
23 February Northern Ireland 3 - 7 Scotland
19 October Northern Ireland 0 - 3 England

Irish League
Winners: Belfast Celtic

Irish Cup
Winners: Ballymena United 2 - 1 Belfast Celtic

Derry City joins the Irish League.

Births
9 January – Brian Friel, playwright (died 2015).
16 July – Tommy Dickson, footballer (died 2007).
25 August – Clifford Forsythe, Ulster Unionist MP for South Antrim (died 2000).
31 August – Elizabeth Magowan Jeffers
 11 September – Patrick Mayhew, 10th Secretary of State for Northern Ireland (died 2016).

Full date unknown
Robert Coulter, Ulster Unionist Party MLA.
Desmond Fennell, writer.

Deaths
29 April – Otto Jaffe, twice elected as Irish Unionist Party Lord Mayor of Belfast (born 1846).
Priscilla Studd, Protestant Christian missionary.

See also
1929 in Scotland
1929 in Wales

References